MOIK Stadium is a multi-use stadium in Baku, Azerbaijan.  It is currently used mostly for football matches. It serves as a home ground of MOIK Baku of the Azerbaijan Premier League.  The stadium holds 3,000 people spectators.

External links
Stadium information

Football venues in Baku